It Happened at the World's Fair is the sixth soundtrack album by American singer and musician Elvis Presley, released by RCA Victor in mono and stereo, LPM/LSP 2697, in April 1963. It is the soundtrack to the 1963 film of the same name starring Presley. Recording sessions took place at Radio Recorders in Hollywood on August 30 and September 22, 1962. It peaked at number four on the Billboard Top Pop Albums chart.

Content
Initially booked for August 28 and 29, sessions were delayed as Presley had taken ill, and only two numbers were completed satisfactorily on the first night of August 30. Ten songs were tackled for the soundtrack, the standouts being two written by one of Presley's favorite songwriters, Don Robertson (who took an active part in the sessions by playing keyboards), and one by Otis Blackwell and Winfield Scott, the team that had written the #2 hit single "Return to Sender" the previous year. All three of these songs, "I'm Falling In Love Tonight", "They Remind Me Too Much of You", and "One Broken Heart for Sale", would be included on the 1995 compilation CD Command Performances: The Essential 60s Masters II.

"One Broken Heart for Sale" and "They Remind Me Too Much of You" would be released ahead of time on January 29 as a single to promote both the album and the film. "Broken Heart" just missed the top ten, peaking at number 11 on the Billboard Hot 100, with the b-side charting independently at number 53. It became a gold record. Truncated with a verse excised to a very short length of 1:35, "One Broken Heart For Sale" was the first RCA single of Presley's career that did not make the top five, excluding "Shake Rattle and Roll" which did not chart at all after being released on August 31, 1956, simultaneously with Presley's debut album divided up into six singles.

Originally a deluxe-priced gatefold sleeve album was planned, but with 20 minutes of music and the relative failure of "One Broken Heart For Sale" the idea was abandoned.

Reissues
In 2003 It Happened at the World's Fair was reissued on the Follow That Dream edition that contained the original album along with numerous alternate takes.

Track listing

Original release

2003 Follow That Dream reissue

Personnel
 Elvis Presley – vocals
 The Jordanaires – backing vocals on "Relax" and “Happy Ending”
 The Mello Men – backing vocals except "Relax" and “Happy Ending”
 Clifford Scott – saxophone
 Scotty Moore – rhythm guitar
Billy Strange – lead guitar, overdubbed ukulele on "Take Me to the Fair"
 Tiny Timbrell – acoustic guitar
 Dudley Brooks – piano, organ
Don Robertson – piano, organ
 Ray Seigel – double bass
 D. J. Fontana – drums
 Frank Carlson – drums

References

External links

LPM-2697 It Happened At The World's Fair Guide part of The Elvis Presley Record Research Database
LSP-2697 It Happened At The World's Fair Guide part of The Elvis Presley Record Research Database

Musical film soundtracks
1963 soundtrack albums
Elvis Presley soundtracks
RCA Records soundtracks
Albums produced by Leith Stevens
Albums recorded at Radio Recorders